Astragalin is a chemical compound. It can be isolated from Phytolacca americana (the American pokeweed) or in the methanolic extract of fronds of the fern Phegopteris connectilis.  It is also found in wine.

Astragalin is a 3-O-glucoside of kaempferol.

References 

Kaempferol glycosides
Flavonol glucosides